Linda Lepomme (born 16 March 1955) is a Belgian actress and singer who represented her country in the Eurovision Song Contest 1985 in which she sang "Laat me nu gaan". She earned seven points finishing in 19th (last) place overall.

Filmography 

 Toch zonde dat 't een hoer is (1978) (TV) ... as  Hippolita
 De Paradijsvogels (1979) TV Series ...
 De Eerste sleutel (1980) (TV) ...
 TV-Touché (1983) TV Series ...
 Zware jongens (1984) ... as singer
 Levenslang (1984) (TV)
 De Leeuw van Vlaanderen (1985) as Nele
 Pauline and Paulette (2001) ... as actress

References 

1955 births
Living people
People from Lokeren
Eurovision Song Contest entrants for Belgium
Belgian women singers
Dutch-language singers of Belgium
Eurovision Song Contest entrants of 1985
Flemish television actresses
20th-century Flemish actresses
Schlager musicians